Chaturanga is a 2008 Indian Bengali-language film directed by  Suman Mukherjee, starring Rituparna Sengupta, Dhritiman Chaterji, Subrata Dutta, Joy Sengupta and Kabir Suman. Based on the 1916 novel, Chaturanga, by author Rabindranath Tagore the film is about a love caught between conflicting worlds of ideas.

Plot
Set in Colonial Bengal at the turn of the twentieth century, the film weaves a rich tapestry of crisscrossing desires and moralities. The protagonist Sachish fleets from radical positivism to religious mysticism in his quest for life's meaning. However, his search ultimately yields nothing but crushing disillusionment. This is because he cannot square his abstract ideals with the powerful presences of two women in his life. One of them is Damini, a young Hindu widow, and the other is Nanibala, the abandoned mistress of Sachish's own brother. Sachish tries to convince himself that Nanibala is simply a helpless woman who needs to be 'rescued' by him. Similarly, during his later religious phase, he pretends that the widow Damini is merely an enticement of Nature that must be avoided at all costs for spiritual salvation. Chaturanga thus becomes, after a point, a psychodrama of cruelty. Nanibala becomes a victim of it because as a 'fallen woman' she can only be 'saved', but her humanity cannot be recognized. Damini is first given away by her dying husband, along with all her property, to a religious guru. She then falls in love with Sachish who can accept her only without her sexuality.

Cast
 Dhritiman Chaterji ... Uncle
 Rituparna Sengupta ... Damini
 Subrat Dutta ... Shachish
 Joy Sengupta ... Shribilash
 Kabir Suman ... Lilananda
 Trina Nileena Banerjee ... Nanibala

Music
The songs, especially those from the Vaishnav tradition, are erotic. The divine is expressed in them through allegorical depictions of the illicit love between Krishna and Radha, who was actually his aunt. There is a radical side to this blend of eroticism and divinity. Radha's love for Krishna is beyond all social norms. It is directly expressed, without the priest or the Brahmin caste coming in between. When devotees sing and rejoice in that form of love, it is thus a popular and democratic process that defies caste divisions.

 "Allah Ke Nur—Shafqat" — Amaanat Ali &  Chorus
"Din Thakte Tiner Sadhan" — Kartick Das Baul
"Bhajo Patito Udhadharana"— Arijit Chakraborty & Chorus
"Hara Gauri Prananath" — Dohar
"Esraj" — Instrumental
"Hari Haraye Nama" — Monomoy Chakraborty & Chorus
"Jagohu Brishobhanu" — Sri Bani Kumar Chatterjee & Chorus
"Hese Khele Nao Re Jogu" — Neel Mukherjee & Chorus
"Rupo Lagi Aankhi Jhure" — Raghab Chatterjee
"Joy Radhe Radhe" — Arijit Chakraborty & Chorus
"Moula Tere Bina" — Shafqat Amaanat Ali & Chorus
"Nirodo Nayane" — Santa Das
"Background Music" — Instrumental
"Praner Majhe Sudha (Hum)" — Parama Banerjee
"Radha Madhabo" — Kabir Suman & Chorus
"Aalo Je Amar Gaan Kore" — Parama Banerjee

References

External links

Official Website

2008 films
2000s Bengali-language films
Bengali-language Indian films
Films directed by Suman Mukhopadhyay
Films based on works by Rabindranath Tagore
Memorials to Rabindranath Tagore
Films scored by Debojyoti Mishra